The cities of Liverpool and Manchester, some  apart in North West England, are connected in many ways, but also have a historic rivalry in sporting and other senses.

History

Industrialisation
In the Victorian era, both cities underwent substantial industrialisation. The Liverpool and Manchester Railway in 1830 was the world's first inter-city railway, and the first railway to rely exclusively on locomotives driven by steam power, with no horse-drawn traffic permitted at any time; the first to be entirely double track throughout its length; the first to have a signalling system; the first to be fully timetabled; and the first to carry mail.

Trains were hauled by company steam locomotives between the two towns, though private wagons and carriages were allowed. Cable haulage of freight trains was down the steeply-graded  Wapping Tunnel to Liverpool Docks from Edge Hill junction.  The railway was primarily built to provide faster transport of raw materials, finished goods and passengers between the Port of Liverpool and the cotton mills and factories of Manchester and surrounding towns.

Designed and built by George Stephenson, the line was financially successful, and influenced the development of railways across Britain in the 1830s. In 1845 the railway was absorbed by its principal business partner, the Grand Junction Railway (GJR), which in turn amalgamated the following year with the London and Birmingham Railway and the Manchester and Birmingham Railway to form the London and North Western Railway.

Manchester Ship Canal
Relations between the cities turned bitter after the construction of the Manchester Ship Canal in 1894 by Manchester merchants. The Mancunian merchants became disenchanted with the dues they had to pay to import and export goods to and from Manchester. Consequently, they decided to build a ship canal, which was the largest ship canal in the world upon opening in 1894.

Road
In 1976, the M62 motorway at the Liverpool end was completed and opened, connecting Liverpool to Manchester by one motorway.

Rivalry
Since the Industrial Revolution, there has been a consistent rivalry between the two cities based on economic and industrial competition. Manchester through to the 18th century was the far more populous city and was considered representative of the north. By the late 18th century, Liverpool had grown as a major seaport – critical to the growth and success of the northern cotton mills. Over the next century, Liverpool grew to supersede Manchester and throughout the late 19th and early 20th century was often described as the British Empire's second city. The links between the two cities were strengthened with the construction of the Bridgewater Canal, the Mersey and Irwell Navigation and the world’s first inter-city railway, the Liverpool and Manchester Railway, for the transport of raw materials inland.

The rivalry is generally agreed to have ignited after the construction of the Manchester Ship Canal. Manchester merchants became disenchanted with the level of dues they had to pay to export and import their goods. The construction, funded by Manchester merchants, was opposed by Liverpool politicians and bred resentment between the two cities. The Ship Canal would become the largest in the world upon opening in January 1894 and highlighted the length the merchants were prepared to take to avoid paying dues. Today, the crests of both the city of Manchester and Manchester United include stylised ships representing the Manchester Ship Canal and Manchester's trade roots. The ship is also included on the crest of many other Mancunian institutions such as Manchester City Council and rivals Manchester City F.C.

Tensions between working-class Liverpool dockers and labourers in Manchester was heightened after its completion in 1894, just three months before the first meeting between Liverpool and Newton Heath (which would later become Manchester United) in a play-off match that would see Newton Heath relegated to the Second Division.
In 2001, an agreement was signed between representatives of the two cities to not compete with each other for funding in which Manchester was referenced as the regional capital city.

Rivalry in football
A notable rivalry exists between the football clubs and supporters of Everton, Liverpool, Manchester City and Manchester United.

Liverpool vs Manchester United 

The rivalry between Liverpool and United supporters is fierce and considered the biggest regional football rivalry in England. This is partly due to the fact that Manchester United and Liverpool have dominated the English game and are the country's two most successful clubs.

Liverpool vs Manchester City 

Liverpool and Manchester City have a newer and growing rivalry that began in the Premier League in the early 2010s, with the rivalry intensifying as the decade progressed. The two clubs competed against each other in the top four in the 2016–17 season. They competed in the Quarter-final in UEFA Champions League in 2017–18, when Liverpool saw off Manchester City. They competed at the top two for the Premier League title for a few times, first in 2013–14 and more recently the historic 2018–19 season, in which both clubs finish with 97 and 98 points respectively (at least 25 above the other clubs), having attempted to one-up against each other throughout the mid-season until the final match of the season, when Manchester City ultimately won the title after defeating Brighton with a 4–1 scoreline. They competed at the top two again in 2019–20 season, with Liverpool finally winning this time.

Everton vs Manchester United 
A significant rivalry dating back to the 1960s, the two have met in two FA Cup finals that both ended in shock wins. A ten-man Manchester United stopping newly crowned League and European Cup Winners' Cup champions Everton 1–0 in 1985. A decade later a mid-table Everton beat a dominant United 1–0 in 1995 with a spirited defensive display. Crowd trouble has often marred fixtures, a 2005 FA Cup game at Goodison Park was described as the "worst football related violence seen in Liverpool" by Merseyside Police.

Cup finals between the cities' teams

See also
North West England#Metropolitan areas
Liverpool and Manchester Railway
Northwest Regional Development Agency

References

Culture in Lancashire
Liverpool
Manchester
North West England
Regional rivalries